Krishna Rukmini is a 1988 Indian Kannada-language film,  directed by  H. R. Bhargava and produced by Smt Suvarna Channanna. The film stars Vishnuvardhan, Ramya Krishna, Hema Choudhary Devaraj and Mukhyamantri Chandru in the lead roles. The film has musical score by K. V. Mahadevan.

Plot
Krishna, a travel guide, falls in love with Rukmini, a dancer. However, things take a turn when her family does not approve of their relationship.

Cast

Vishnuvardhan
Ramya Krishna
Vanitha Vasu
Devaraj
Hema Choudhary
Mukhyamantri Chandru
Vijay Kashi
Mysore Lokesh
Umashree
Gayathri Prabhakar
Abhinaya
Dinesh
Sudheer
Phani Ramachandra

Soundtrack
The music was composed by K. V. Mahadevan

References

External links
 

1988 films
1980s Kannada-language films
Films scored by K. V. Mahadevan
Films directed by H. R. Bhargava